The 2003–04 NBA season was the 58th season of the National Basketball Association. The season ended with the Detroit Pistons defeating the Los Angeles Lakers 4–1 in the 2004 NBA Finals.

Events
This was the last season for the original two-division format in both the Eastern and Western Conferences, before each of the conferences added a third division the following season. As a result, this would also be the final season for the NBA Midwest Division, as the Minnesota Timberwolves were that division's last champion, the only division title the franchise has won in their twenty-nine seasons in the NBA.

The All-Star Game was held at the Staples Center in Los Angeles. The West won 136–132; Lakers center Shaquille O'Neal was named Most Valuable Player.

For the first time in 21 years the Portland Trail Blazers did not make the playoffs, ending the second longest streak in NBA history. For the first time in 20 years the Utah Jazz did not make the playoffs, ending the third longest streak in NBA history.

The Houston Rockets played their first game at the Toyota Center. They reached the playoffs for the first time since 1999 and lost to the eventual Conference champion Lakers in five games. This marked the only playoff appearance of Steve Francis NBA career.

Prior to the start of the season, Karl Malone and Gary Payton took major paycuts to leave their teams and join Kobe Bryant and Shaquille O'Neal on the Lakers for a chance at a possible NBA title. However, that title chase came to an end in the NBA Finals, as the Detroit Pistons won 4–1. The Minnesota Timberwolves, behind their "Big Three" of Kevin Garnett, Latrell Sprewell, and Sam Cassell, amassed the best record in the Western Conference, and were expected to finally win a first round playoff series. They won two and advanced to the Western Conference Finals, which they lost to the Lakers. It would be their last playoff appearance until the 2017–18 season.

LeBron James (1st overall to Cleveland), Carmelo Anthony (3rd overall to Denver), Chris Bosh (4th overall to Toronto), and Dwyane Wade (5th overall to Miami), among others, formed one of the strongest drafts in NBA history.  Among the highly touted rookies, Anthony and Wade led their teams to the playoffs, and Wade's play pushed the Heat into the second round. James went on to win NBA Rookie of the Year. Anthony became the first NBA rookie to lead a playoff team in scoring since David Robinson of the San Antonio Spurs during the 1989–90 season.

The Memphis Grizzlies qualified for the postseason for the first time in the franchise's then 9 year history, dating back to their days in Vancouver. With a record of 50–32, it was also the first time they posted a winning season. It was also their last season played at Pyramid Arena.

Tracy McGrady was the first scoring leader since Bernard King in 1984–85 whose team did not make the playoffs.

General Motors ended its sponsorship deal with the NBA after this season (having rotated among all eight of its U.S. divisions, including Saturn and Hummer), after which Toyota would become the new official partner.

Coaching

2003–04 NBA changes
Cleveland Cavaliers – added new logo and new uniforms, brought back the original wine and gold to their color scheme, added dark navy blue trim to their color scheme replacing black, light blue and orange, also added side panels to their jerseys and shorts.
Denver Nuggets – added new logo and new uniforms, replacing dark navy blue, red and gold with light blue and gold, added side panels to their jerseys and shorts.
Dallas Mavericks – added new grey road alternate uniforms.
Houston Rockets – added new logo and new uniforms, replacing dark navy blue, red and grey colors with remained red and grey, and moved into their new arena the Toyota Center.
Orlando Magic – changed their uniforms and wordmarks on their jerseys.
Phoenix Suns – added new orange road alternate uniforms with grey side panels to their jerseys and shorts.
Portland Trail Blazers – slightly once again changed their primary logo.
Toronto Raptors – added new red road alternate uniforms with black and grey side panels to their jerseys and shorts.

Standings

By division

Eastern Conference

Western Conference

By conference

Notes
z – Clinched home court advantage for the entire playoffs
c – Clinched home court advantage for the conference playoffs
y – Clinched division title 
x – Clinched playoff spot

Playoffs
Teams in bold advanced to the next round. The numbers to the left of each team indicate the team's seeding in its conference, and the numbers to the right indicate the number of games the team won in that round. The division champions are marked by an asterisk. Home court advantage does not necessarily belong to the higher-seeded team, but instead the team with the better regular season record; teams enjoying the home advantage are shown in italics.

Statistics leaders

Awards

Yearly awards
Most Valuable Player: Kevin Garnett, Minnesota Timberwolves
Rookie of the Year: LeBron James, Cleveland Cavaliers
Defensive Player of the Year: Ron Artest, Indiana Pacers
Sixth Man of the Year: Antawn Jamison, Dallas Mavericks
Most Improved Player: Zach Randolph, Portland Trail Blazers
Coach of the Year: Hubie Brown, Memphis Grizzlies
Executive of the Year: Jerry West, Memphis Grizzlies
Sportsmanship Award: P. J. Brown, New Orleans Hornets
J. Walter Kennedy Citizenship Award: Reggie Miller, Indiana Pacers

All-NBA First Team:
F – Kevin Garnett, Minnesota Timberwolves
F – Tim Duncan, San Antonio Spurs
C – Shaquille O'Neal, Los Angeles Lakers
G – Kobe Bryant, Los Angeles Lakers
G – Jason Kidd, New Jersey Nets

All-NBA Second Team:
F – Peja Stojaković, Sacramento Kings
F – Jermaine O'Neal, Indiana Pacers
C – Ben Wallace, Detroit Pistons
G – Tracy McGrady, Orlando Magic 
G – Sam Cassell, Minnesota Timberwolves

All-NBA Third Team
F – Ron Artest, Indiana Pacers
F – Dirk Nowitzki, Dallas Mavericks
C – Yao Ming, Houston Rockets
G – Michael Redd, Milwaukee Bucks
G – Baron Davis, New Orleans Hornets

NBA All-Defensive First Team:
F – Ron Artest, Indiana Pacers
F – Kevin Garnett, Minnesota Timberwolves
C – Ben Wallace, Detroit Pistons
G – Bruce Bowen, San Antonio Spurs
G – Kobe Bryant, Los Angeles Lakers

NBA All-Defensive Second Team
F – Andrei Kirilenko, Utah Jazz
F – Tim Duncan, San Antonio Spurs
C – Theo Ratliff, Portland Trail Blazers
G – Doug Christie, Sacramento Kings
G – Jason Kidd, New Jersey Nets

NBA All-Rookie First Team:
LeBron James, Cleveland Cavaliers
Carmelo Anthony, Denver Nuggets
Dwyane Wade, Miami Heat
Chris Bosh, Toronto Raptors
Kirk Hinrich, Chicago Bulls

All-Rookie Second Team:
Udonis Haslem, Miami Heat
Marquis Daniels, Dallas Mavericks
Jarvis Hayes, Washington Wizards
Josh Howard, Dallas Mavericks
T. J. Ford, Milwaukee Bucks

Players of the month
The following players were named the Eastern and Western Conference Players of the Month.

Rookies of the month
The following players were named the Eastern and Western Conference Rookies of the Month.

Coaches of the month
The following coaches were named the Eastern and Western Conference Coaches of the Month.

References

 
NBA
2003–04 in Canadian basketball